The Ministers of the French National Convention were appointed on 10 August 1792 after the French Legislative Assembly suspended King Louis XVI and revoked the ministers that he had named.

On 12 Germinal year II (1 April 1794) Lazare Carnot proposed to suppress the executive council and the six ministers, replacing the ministers with twelve Committees reporting to the Committee of Public Safety. The proposal was unanimously adopted by the National Convention.

Ministers

References
Citations

Sources

1792 establishments in France
1794 disestablishments in France
French governments
Ministers